Paranthrene tabaniformis, the dusky clearwing, is a moth of the family Sesiidae. It is found in the Palearctic and Nearctic realms.

The wingspan is  30 mm. The length of the forewings is c. 14 mm. Meyrick describes it - Head with white vertical bar before each eye, and yellow posterior ring. Abdomen with yellow rings on 2, 4, 6, and sometimes 7. Middle and posterior tibiae orange, blackbanded. Forewings rather dark fuscous, with elongate obscure hyaline patch towards base; costal streak violet-blackish. Hindwings hyaline ; veins and termen dark fuscous. The moth flies from May to August depending on the location.

The larvae feed on poplar and willow, as well as sea-buckthorn. 

The larvae have 6-7 stages. Mature larvae pupate in chambers within larval galleries. The pupae are found in the center of one-year poplar seedlings, or beneath the bark of stems and branches in the oldest trees.

Adults are effective fliers, though little is known about the flight distances of adult female P. tabaniformis.

P. tabaniformis resemble wasps, possibly as Batesian mimicry.

Subspecies
Paranthrene tabaniformis tabaniformis
Paranthrene tabaniformis kungessana (Alpheraky, 1882)
Paranthrene tabaniformis synagriformis (Rambur, 1866)

References

External links

Vlindernet 
waarneming.nl 
Lepidoptera of Belgium
Dusky clearwing at UK Moths

Sesiidae
Moths described in 1775
Moths of Europe
Moths of Japan
Moths of Asia
Taxa named by S. A. von Rottemburg